Signs of Chaos: The Best of Testament is a compilation album by Testament, released in 1997. Similar to their next collection The Very Best of Testament, it not only includes tracks from the band's tenure with Atlantic Records, but also two non-album tracks which are covers of Scorpions' "The Sails of Charon" and Aerosmith's "Draw the Line"; they were both released as B-sides on the 1994 CD single "Dog Faced Gods". Also included on this compilation album is "Demonic Refusal", a track from their then-latest album Demonic.

Track listing
"Signs of Chaos"
"Electric Crown"
"The New Order"
"Alone in the Dark"
"Dog Faced Gods"
"Demonic Refusal"
"The Ballad"
"Souls of Black"
"Trial by Fire"
"Low"
"Practice What You Preach"
"Over the Wall"
"The Legacy"
"Return to Serenity"
"Perilous Nation"
"The Sails of Charon" (Ulrich Roth)
"Draw the Line" (Steven Tyler, Joe Perry)

References

1997 greatest hits albums
Testament (band) compilation albums